Simon McQuoid is an Australian filmmaker, best known for directing the 2021 reboot of Mortal Kombat. McQuoid's background was in directing commercials. In May 2022, Deadline reported that McQuoid will direct the sci-fi film Omega for Sony Pictures, before directing the Mortal Kombat sequel.

Filmography

References

External links

Official site

Australian film directors
Living people
Year of birth missing (living people)